{{Speciesbox
| image = Trigonocephale.JPG
| image_caption = Taxidermied museum exhibit
| genus = Bothrops
| species = lanceolatus
| status = EN
| status_system = IUCN3.1
| status_ref = 
| authority = (Bonnaterre, 1790)
| synonyms = * Vipera Caerulescens Laurenti, 1768
 [Coluber] glaucus Gmelin, 1788
 C[oluber]. Lanceolatus Lacépède, 1789
 C[oluber]. Brasiliensis Lacépède, 1789
 C[oluber]. Tigrinus Lacépède, 1789
 C[oluber]. lanceolatus – Bonaterre, 1790 C[oluber]. hastatus Suckow, 1798
 Vipera lanceolata – Latreille In Sonnini & Latreille, 1801
 Vipera brasiliniana Latreille In Sonnini & Latreille, 1801
 Coluber Megaera Shaw, 1802
 Vipera tigrina – Daudin, 1803
 Vipera brasiliana Daudin, 1803
 Trigonocephalus lanceolatus – Oppel, 1811
 [Trigonocephalus] tigrinus – Oppel, 1811
 [Cophias] lanceolatus – Merrem, 1820
 Trigonoceph[alus]. lanceolatus – Schinz, 1822
 Craspedocephalus lanceolatus – Fitzinger, 1826
 [Bothrops] lanceolatus – Wagler, 1830
 T[rigonocephalus]. lanceolatus – Schlegel, 1837
 Bothrops cenereus Gray, 1842
 C[rasedocephalus]. brasiliensis – Wucherer, 1863
 Bothrops brasiliensis – Cope, 1875
 Bothrops glaucus – Vaillant, 1887
 Lachesis lanceolatus – Boulenger, 1896
 Lachesis lanceolata – Boettger, 1898
 Bothrops lanceolata – Hoge, 1953
 Vipera coerulescens Hoge & Romano-Hoge, 1981
 Bothrops l[anceolatus]. lanceolatus – Sandner-Montilla, 1990
 Bothrops lanceolatus – Golay et al., 1993
 Vipera coerulescens – Golay et al., 1993
}}Bothrops lanceolatus — known as the fer-de-lance, Martinican pit viper, and Martinique lancehead — is a species of pit viper endemic to the Caribbean island of Martinique. Some reserve the common name fer-de-lance for this species, while others apply that name to other Bothrops species as well. No subspecies are currently recognized.

Geographic range
Bothrops lanceolatus is generally considered endemic to the island of Martinique in the Lesser Antilles. Along with Bothrops caribbaeus and B. atrox, it is one of three Bothrops species found in the West Indies. The type locality according to Bonnaterre (1790:11) is "La Martinique".

Description
It measures 1.50 to 2 m long (5 feet long). Its color is brown, black and gray.

Behavior
As ambush predators, Martinique lancehead typically wait patiently somewhere for unsuspecting prey to wander by. It is known to select a specific ambush site and return to it every year in time for the spring migration of birds. Studies have indicated these snakes learn to improve their strike accuracy over time.

Diet
All of the various species are carnivorous, and eat other animals. Their diet primarily changes based on how large the snake is and where the snake lives. Larger individuals can feed on larger prey, while smaller species must eat smaller prey items. Martinican pit vipers hunt rats, mice, birds, rabbits, lizards, frogs, snakes, bats, and more.

Reproduction
With few exceptions, crotalines are ovoviviparous, meaning that the embryos develop within eggs that remain inside the mother's body until the offspring are ready to hatch, at which time the hatchlings emerge as functionally free-living young. In such species, the eggshells are reduced to soft membranes that the young shed, either within the reproductive tract, or immediately after emerging.

Venom
The venom has toxins that can cause clotting, and bleeding in humans, as well as muscle damage and swelling.

Vexillological trivia
The species is depicted on the unofficial flag of Martinique, one of the few examples (the Gadsden flag and the First Navy Jack of the United States, and the Flag of Mexico being others) of snakes being depicted on flags.

References

Further reading
 Bonnaterre, J. 1790. Tableau encyclopédique et methodique des trois règnes de la nature, Ophiologie. Panckoucke. Paris. xliv + 76 pp. + plates A., 1.- 42. ("C[oluber]. Lanceolatus", p. 10.)

External links

lanceolatus
Endemic fauna of Martinique
Snakes of the Caribbean
Reptiles described in 1790
Taxa named by Pierre Joseph Bonnaterre